The Mid-Season Invitational (MSI) is an annual League of Legends international tournament hosted by Riot Games in the middle of years, since 2015. It is the second most important international League of Legends tournament aside from the World Championship.

In 2015 and 2016, the event featured the Spring Split champions of the five major competitive League of Legends regional leagues (LEC, LCS, LCK, LMS, LPL), as well as a wildcard team from a region determined by the International Wildcard Invitational, held a few weeks beforehand. In its inaugural tournament, Chinese team Edward Gaming emerged victorious by defeating South Korean team SK Telecom T1 3–2 in the final.

Since 2017, Spring Split champions from all regions have been participating in the event. The International Wildcard Invitational was replaced by the Play-in Stage. The best Wildcard region receives a direct spot in the World Championship's Group Stage for that year for their Summer Split champion. The top four regions gets the pool 1 spot in the World Championship's Group Stage.

Royal Never Give Up from China is the most successful team with three MSI titles.

History

2015 

The 2015 Mid-Season Invitational was held from 7–10 May 2015 in Tallahassee, Florida. Five teams qualified to participate at the Mid-Season Invitational after winning the Spring Split within their own regional leagues, while a team from the Wildcard regions qualified by winning the Mid-Season International Wildcard Invitational (IWCI).

All games of the tournament were hosted in the Donald L. Tucker Civic Center. The final was played on 10 May 2015 between Edward Gaming, from China's League of Legends Pro League, and SK Telecom T1, from League of Legends Champions Korea, with Edward Gaming winning the inaugural championship 3–2.

2016 

The 2016 Mid-Season Invitational was held from 4–15 May 2016 in Shanghai, China. In line with last years iteration, 5 teams qualified to participate at the Mid-Season Invitational after winning the Spring Split within their own regional leagues, while a team from the Wildcard regions qualified by winning the Mid-Season International Wildcard Invitational (IWCI).

All games of the tournament were hosted in the Shanghai Oriental Sports Center. The final was played on 10 May 2015 between Counter Logic Gaming, from the North American League of Legends Championship Series, and SK Telecom T1, from League of Legends Champions Korea, with SK Telecom T1 winning the championship 3–0. Lee "Faker" Sang-hyeok was awarded the MVP in the final.

2017 

The 2017 Mid-Season Invitation was held from 28 April to 21 May 2017, in 2 cities across Brazil: São Paulo (play in) and Rio de Janeiro (groups and knockout stage). Departing from the previous years, thirteen teams qualified for the event by winning their respective Spring Splits, with the representatives from Europe (EU LCS), South Korea (LCK), and China (LPL) had their teams automatically admitted into the main event, while the other teams were admitted into the "play-in stage", where the top three teams in that stage qualified for the group stage.

The final was played on 21 May 2017, hosted in the Jeunesse Arena, between defending champions SK Telecom T1, from South Korea's League of Legends Champions Korea, and G2 Esports, from the European League of Legends Championship Series, with SK Telecom T1 retaining the championship 3–1, becoming the first team to win back-to-back Mid-Season Invitationals. Lee "Wolf" Jae-wan was awarded the MVP in the finals.

2018 

The 2018 Mid-Season Invitational was held between 3–20 May 2018 in Germany and France. The two cities that hosted this event were Berlin (play-in & groups), and Paris (knockout stage). Fourteen teams qualified after winning their respective Spring Splits, with the teams from South Korea (LCK), North America (NA LCS) and China (LPL) automatically seeded into the group stage, whereas the other 10 leagues will compete among each other in a "play-in" with the top 2 teams advancing to join the main event.

The final was played on 20 May 2018, hosted in the Zénith Paris, between King-Zone DragonX, from South Korea's League of Legends Champions Korea, and Royal Never Give Up, from China's League of Legends Pro League, with Royal Never Give Up winning the championship 3–1, with Jian "Uzi" Zihao being awarded the MVP of the finals.

The finals, became one of the most watched esports matches in history, being watched by over 127 million unique viewers (mostly attributed to China's viewership), while the entire event boasted a total viewing time of over 2 billion hours.

2019  

The 2019 Mid-Season Invitational was held between 1–19 May 2018 in Vietnam and Taiwan. Three cities that hosted this event were Ho Chi Minh City (play-in), Hanoi (groups), and Taipei (knockout stage). Similar to the 2017 Mid-Season Invitational, thirteen teams qualified for the event, as based on the regional results of the MSI and the World Championship in the two years prior (2017 and 2018), three teams from Europe (LEC), South Korea (LCK), and China (LPL) began in the main group stage; two teams from North America (LCS) and Taiwan/Hong Kong/Macau (LMS) begin in the second round of the play-in stage; and the eight remaining teams begin in the first round of the play-in stage.

The final was played on 19 May 2019, hosted in the Taipei Heping Basketball Gymnasium, between G2 Esports, from Europe's League of Legends European Championship, and Team Liquid, from North America's League of Legends Championship Series, with G2 Esports winning the championship 3–0, becoming the first European team to win the Mid-Season Invitational. Rasmus "Caps" Winther was given the MVP award for his performance in the final.

2020  

Due to the COVID-19 pandemic, Riot Games cancelled the event, replacing it with the Mid-Season Streamathon, a series of international competitions and exhibition matches from multiple regions.

2021 

The 2021 Mid-Season Invitational was held from 6–23 May 2021 in Reykjavík, Iceland. Twelve teams qualified for the event, where all teams began in the same stage of the tournament, unlike previous years where the winners of the minor leagues had to win play-in matches to face teams from the larger regions. GAM Esports, from the Vietnam Championship Series, was unable to attend the event due to travel restrictions related to the COVID-19 pandemic.

All games of the tournament were hosted in the Laugardalshöll, with no fans in attendance due to the COVID-19 pandemic in Iceland. The final was played on 23 May 2021 between the 2018 Mid-Season Invitational champions Royal Never Give Up, from China's League of Legends Pro League, and the defending World champions DWG KIA (formerly Damwon Gaming), from League of Legends Champions Korea. Royal Never Give Up won the championship 3–2, becoming the second team after T1 (formerly SK Telecom T1) to win two Mid-Season Invitationals. Chen "GALA" Wei was awarded the MVP in the final.

2022 

The 2022 Mid-Season Invitational was held from 10–29 May 2022 in Busan, South Korea. Similar to the previous event, eleven teams qualified for the event, where all teams began in the same stage of the tournament, unlike previous years where the winners of the minor leagues had to win play-in matches to face teams from the larger regions. The CIS's League of Legends Continental League was unable to send a representative to the event due to the cancellation of their Spring Split, in response to the 2022 Russian invasion of Ukraine.

Due to travel restrictions related to the COVID-19 pandemic in Shanghai, where most of China's LPL teams are based, the LPL representative, Royal Never Give Up had competed in the tournament remotely from the team's training facility or the LPL Arena in Shanghai. All other representatives competed with artificially standardized ping to ensure competitive integrity.

The final was played on 29 May 2022, hosted in the Busan Exhibition and Convention Center (BEXCO). The series was played between the two most successful teams in the competition's history at the time, the defending champions Royal Never Give Up, from China's League of Legends Pro League, and T1, from League of Legends Champions Korea. In the final, Royal Never Give Up won the championship 3–2, becoming the first team to win three MSI titles, and the second team to successfully defend their title (after T1 in 2017). Yan "Wei" Yangwei was awarded the MVP for his performance in the final.

2023 

The 2023 Mid-Season Invitational will be held from 2–21 May 2023 in London, United Kingdom. Thirteen teams from nine regions qualified for the event as champions of their regional Spring splits, excluding North America (LCS), EMEA (Europe, the Middle East and Africa), Korea (LCK), and China (LPL), who each will have two teams participate in the tournament. As a result of this change, the Spring Split champions from Turkey (TCL) and Oceania (LCO) will no longer participate in the event due to the Turkish league losing their regional status to become a European Regional League (ERL), and the Oceania league merging under the Southeast Asian Pacific Championship Series (PCS).

The format for the event differed to the previous editions, with the introduction of a play-in stage, consisting of eight teams who are split into two double elimination brackets. There, three teams will qualify to the main tournament bracket where the qualifying teams, along with five other teams, will face off in a double elimination bracket to determine the winner of the tournament.

All games of the tournament will be hosted in the Copper Box Arena.

Results

Year-by-year

Regions reaching top four

Teams reaching top four 
 Background shading indicates a team/organization has been disbanded, acquired or no longer participates in the regional league.

Notes

References 

 
League of Legends competitions
Recurring sporting events established in 2015